Etruria station is a closed station in Stoke-on-Trent, Staffordshire, England, which served the areas of Etruria and the larger district of Newcastle-under-Lyme. It closed on 30 September 2005.

History
The station was opened 9 October 1848 by the North Staffordshire Railway and was modified by it in the 1870s, when the Potteries Loop Line was constructed. The station was an island platform situated underneath a bridge carrying the A53, approximately one mile north of Stoke-on-Trent station. Its train services were suspended in May 2003 during the upgrade of the West Coast Main Line. Central Trains did not restart services to Etruria when the work was finished and continued to serve the station with rail replacement buses only, although First North Western reintroduced a limited service, beyond what was contractually required.

Closure
After already low passenger numbers dwindled even further, closure was proposed by the Strategic Rail Authority in February 2004. The closure was granted approval by the Department for Transport on 21 July 2005. The final train was Northern Rail Class 323 unit 323226 which left at 07:16 to Manchester Piccadilly. The closure was condemned by Transport 2000.

The platform signage and platform objects were removed in June 2006 and by December 2008 the platform had been demolished to permit the straightening of the track and remove a  speed restriction to allow trains to run at  southbound and  northbound.

Possible reopening
In March 2020, a bid was made to the Restoring Your Railway fund to get funds for a feasibility study into reinstating the station. This bid was unsuccessful.

A second bid was made to the Restoring your railways fund in 2021, this bid was also unsuccessful.

Route

References

External links
Guardian.co.uk: Last train to Etruria
BBC Stoke & Staffordshire - 360° view of Etruria Station

Buildings and structures in Stoke-on-Trent
Disused railway stations in Stoke-on-Trent
Railway stations in Great Britain opened in 1848
Railway stations in Great Britain closed in 2005
Former North Staffordshire Railway stations